The Bonne projection is a pseudoconical  equal-area map projection, sometimes called a dépôt de la guerre, modified Flamsteed, or a Sylvanus projection. Although named after Rigobert Bonne (1727–1795), the projection was in use prior to his birth, in 1511 by Sylvanus, Honter in 1561, De l'Isle before 1700 and Coronelli in 1696. Both Sylvanus and Honter's usages were approximate, however, and it is not clear they intended to be the same projection.

The Bonne projection maintains accurate shapes of areas along the central meridian and the standard parallel, but progressively distorts away from those regions. Thus, it best maps "t"-shaped regions. It has been used extensively for maps of Europe and Asia.

The projection is defined as:

where

and φ is the latitude, λ is the longitude, λ0 is the longitude of the central meridian, and φ1 is the standard parallel of the projection.

Parallels of latitude are concentric circular arcs, and the scale is true along these arcs.  On the central meridian and the standard latitude shapes are not distorted.

The inverse projection is given by:

where

taking the sign of φ1.

Special cases of the Bonne projection include the sinusoidal projection, when φ1 is zero (i.e. the Equator), and the Werner projection, when φ1 is 90° (i.e. the North or South Pole). The Bonne projection can be seen as an intermediate projection in the unwinding of a Werner projection into a Sinusoidal projection; an alternative intermediate would be a Bottomley projection.

See also

List of map projections

References

External links

Table of examples and properties of all common projections, from radicalcartography.net
An interactive Java Applet to study the metric deformations of the Bonne Projection
Bonne Projection (wolfram.com)

Map projections
Equal-area projections